Øyvind Sverre Bruland (born 14 December 1952) is a professor of Clinical Oncology and faculty of Medicine at the University of Oslo. Bruland holds a B.Sc., M.D and Ph.D. from the University of Oslo, Norway. His research includes: primary bone and soft tissue cancers (sarcomas) and skeletal metastases from prostate cancer and breast cancer; targeted radionuclide therapy, for instance the clinical development of Alpharadin, based on Radium-223; the tumor biology and prognostic impact of micro-metastases in bone-marrow aspirates on patients with primary bone cancer (osteosarcoma); external beam radiotherapy; and the radiotherapy of skeletal metastases and soft-tissue sarcomas.

He has served as supervisor to twelve Ph.D students, nine so far having completed their Ph.D. theses. In 2008 he was elected as a member of the Norwegian Academy of Science and Letters.

References 
Alpharadin trial treatment of cancer with skeletal metastasis
Lancet publication of Alpaharadin phase II results
US Approval for phase III testing of Alpharadin
US National Institute of Health information on Alpharadin
Publications according to PubMed
Øyvind S. Bruland, further information

1952 births
Living people
University of Oslo alumni
Members of the Norwegian Academy of Science and Letters